Mesudus is a genus of South Pacific intertidal spiders that was first described by H. Özdikmen in 2007.  it contains only three species, all found in New Zealand: M. frondosus, M. setosus, and M. solitarius.

References

Araneomorphae genera
Desidae
Spiders of New Zealand